Gaston Alberto Mouriño (born 12 October 1994) is an Argentine handball player for CSKA Moscow and the Argentine national team. He represented Argentina at the 2019 World Men's Handball Championship and 2021 World Men's Handball Championship.

References

1994 births
Living people
Argentine male handball players
Expatriate handball players
Argentine expatriate sportspeople in Spain
Handball players at the 2020 Summer Olympics
21st-century Argentine people